Vigna mungo, also known as black gram, urad bean, urid bean, mash kalai, uzhunnu parippu, ulundu paruppu, minapa pappu, uddu, or black matpe, is a bean grown in South Asia. Like its relative, the mung bean, it has been reclassified from the Phaseolus to the Vigna genus. The product sold as black lentil is usually the whole urad bean, whereas the split bean (the interior being white) is called white lentil. It should not be confused with the much smaller true black lentil (Lens culinaris).

Black gram originated in South Asia, where it has been in cultivation from ancient times and is one of the most highly prized pulses of India. It is very widely used in Indian cuisine. In India the black gram is one of the important pulses grown in both Kharif and Rabi seasons. This crop is extensively grown in southern part of India, northern part of Bangladesh and Nepal. In Bangladesh and Nepal it is known as mash daal. It is a popular daal (legume) side dish in South Asia, that goes with curry and rice as a platter. Black gram has also been introduced to other tropical areas such as the Caribbean, Fiji, Mauritius, Myanmar and Africa.

Description
It is an erect, suberect or trailing, densely hairy, annual bush. The tap root produces a branched root system with smooth, rounded nodules. The pods are narrow, cylindrical and up to six cm long. The plant grows 30–100 cm with large hairy leaves and 4–6 cm seed pods. While the urad dal was, along with the mung bean, originally placed in Phaseolus, it has since been transferred to Vigna.

Cooking

Vigna mungo is popular in Northern India, largely used to make dal from the whole or split, dehusked seeds. The bean is boiled and eaten whole or, after splitting, made into dal; prepared like this it has an unusual mucilaginous texture.

Its usage is quite common in Dogra Cuisine of Jammu and Lower Himachal region. The key ingredient of Dal Maddhra or Maah Da Maddhra dish served in Dogri Dhaam of Jammu is Vigna Mungo lentil. Similarly, another dish Teliya Maah popular in Jammu & Kangra uses this lentil. Traditionally, Vigna Mungo Lentil is used for preparing Dogra style Khichdi during Panj Bhikham and Makar Sankranti festival in Jammu and Lower Himachal. Besides, fermented Vigna Mungo paste is also used to prepare Lakhnapuri Bhalle or Lakhanpuri Laddu ( a popular street food of Jammu region).

In Uttarakhand Cuisine, Vigna Mungo is used for preparing traditional dish called Chainsu or Chaisu.

In North Indian cuisine, it is used as an ingredient of Dal makhani, which is a Modern restaurant style adaptation of Traditional Sabut Urad Dal of Northern India.

In Bengal, it is used in kalai ruti, biulir dal. In Rajasthan, It is one of the ingredients of Panchmel dal which is usually consumed with bati.

It is also extensively used in South Indian culinary preparations. Black gram is one of the key ingredients in making idli and dosa batter, in which one part of black gram is mixed with three or four parts of idli rice to make the batter. Vada or udid vada also contain black gram and are made from soaked batter and deep-fried in cooking oil. The dough is also used in making papadum, in which white lentils are usually used.

Nutrition 

Its nutrition numbers when raw differ from when cooked. When raw it contains high levels of protein (25g/100g), potassium (983mg/100g), calcium (138mg/100g), iron (7.57mg/100g), niacin (1.447mg/100g), thiamine (0.273mg/100g), and riboflavin (0.254mg/100g). Black gram complements the essential amino acids provided in most cereals and plays an important role in the diets of the people of Nepal and India. Black gram is also very high in folate (628µg/100g raw, 216µg/100g cooked).

Use in medieval crucible construction
In medieval India, this bean was used in a technique to facilitate making crucibles impermeable.

Names

Vigna mungo is known by various names across South and Southeast Asia. Its name in most languages of India derives from Proto-Dravidian *uẓ-untu-, borrowed into Sanskrit as uḍida:
 Caribbean Hindustani/Fiji Hindi: उरदी दाल urdi dal
 Gujarati: અળદ aḷad, અડદ aḍad
 Hindi: उड़द दाल uṛad dāl,  उरद दाल urad dāl
 Kannada: ಉದ್ದು uddu, ಉದ್ದಿನ ಬೇಳೆ uddina bēḷe
 Marathi/Konkani: उडीद uḍid
 Malayalam: ഉഴുന്ന് uẓhunnu
 Punjabi: ਮਾਂਹ ਦੀ ਦਾਲ, "mānha di dāl" 
 Tamil: உளுந்து uḷuntu, ulundu, ulutham paruppu
 Telugu: మినుములు minumulu and uddhi pappu in Rayalaseema
 Tulu: urdu bele
 Urdu: اورد دال urad dāl
Its name in selected Indic languages, however, derives from Sanskrit masa (माष) :

 Dogri: 𑠢𑠬𑠪𑠹 𑠛𑠮 𑠛𑠬𑠥, Maah Di Daal, माह् दी दाल
 Assamese: মাটিমাহ matimah, মাটিকলাই matikolai
 Bengali: মাসকালাই ডাল mashkalai ḍal
 Nepali: Kalo Daal( black lentil), मास mās
 Punjabi : دال ماش dāl māsh
Other names include:
 Odia: ବିରି ଡାଲି biri ḍāli
 Sinhala : උඳු undu
 Myanmar: မတ်ပဲ matpe
 Vietnamese: đậu muồng ăn

Varieties

Pant Urd 31 (PU-31)
Lam Black Gram 884 (LBG 884)
Trombay Urd (TU 40)
Pant U-13
JU-2
Type-9
Barkha
Gwalior-2
Mutant varieties:CO-1 and Sarla.
Spring season varieties:Prabha and AKU-4.
First urad bean variety developed in – T9(1948).

See also
 Kalai ruti
 Uttapam
 Chakuli pitha
 Dahi vada

References

Bibliography 
 
 M. Nitin, S. Ifthekar, M. Mumtaz. 2012. Hepatoprotective activity of Methanolic extract of blackgram. RGUHS J Pharm Sci 2(2):62-67.

External links

 Vigna mungo (L.) Hepper

mungo
Edible legumes
Nitrogen-fixing crops
Crops originating from India